Charles Henry Ilgenfritz (March 4, 1837 – March 31, 1920) was a Union Army soldier in the American Civil War who received the U.S. military's highest decoration, the Medal of Honor.

Ilgenfritz was born in York County, Pennsylvania on March 4, 1837. He was awarded the Medal of Honor, for extraordinary heroism on April 2, 1865, while serving as a Sergeant with Company E, 207th Pennsylvania Infantry Regiment, at Fort Sedgwick, Virginia. His Medal of Honor was issued on March 20, 1917.

He died at the age of 83, on March 31, 1920, and was buried at the Prospect Hill Cemetery in York County, Pennsylvania.

Medal of Honor citation

References

External links
 

1837 births
1920 deaths
American Civil War recipients of the Medal of Honor
People from York County, Pennsylvania
People of Pennsylvania in the American Civil War
Union Army officers
United States Army Medal of Honor recipients